Rosiclare Precinct is located in Hardin County, Illinois, USA.  As of the 2010 census, its population was 1,186.

Geography

References

Precincts in Hardin County, Illinois